The 1985 UK Championship (also known as the 1985 Coral UK Championship for sponsorship reasons) was a professional ranking snooker tournament that took place between 15 November and 1 December 1985 at the Guild Hall in Preston, England. The last-16 televised stages were shown on the BBC from 23 November through to the end of the championship. The event was sponsored by sports betting company Coral.

Steve Davis won his fourth UK Championship title by defeating Willie Thorne 16–14 in the final. Thorne had led 12–6 and 13–8, but the match turned after Thorne missed a straight blue which would have given him a 14–8 lead. Davis subsequently won the frame and seven of the next eight to clinch the title. Stephen Hendry made his debut in the tournament, aged sixteen, but lost his first qualifying round match 2–9 to Omprakesh Agrawal.

The highest break of the tournament was a 140 made by Willie Thorne during the non-televised stages; the highest break of the televised stages was a 135 made by Neal Foulds.

Prize fund
The breakdown of prize money for this year is shown below:
Winner   £24,000
Runner-up £14,000
Total   £120,000

Main draw

Final

Century breaks
 140, 121, 115, 112, 112, 104, 102  Willie Thorne
 137, 101  Alex Higgins
 136, 130, 105  Neal Foulds
 135  Dennis Taylor
 134, 103  Peter Francisco
 130  Mario Morra
 128, 115  Cliff Thorburn
 128, 111, 109  Terry Griffiths
 127, 122, 115, 106, 104, 102  Steve Davis
 122  Steve Newbury
 119, 108, 104, 103  John Virgo
 110  Omprakesh Agrawal
 109  John Spencer
 109  Kirk Stevens
 107, 107, 101, 100  Jimmy White
 106  John Campbell
 105  Joe Johnson
 101  Ray Edmonds
 101  Warren King

References

1985
UK Championship
UK Championship
UK Championship
UK Championship